Helodeaster erici is a plant species from the genus Helodeaster endemic to Kauai. The species was originally described in 2020 by Guy L. Nesom.

References

Asteraceae
Plants described in 2020